The Victoria County Board of Education (VCBE) is a former school board in the Canadian province of Ontario. The board oversaw several schools in the Victoria County area until 1999, when it was amalgamated into the Trillium Lakelands District School Board.

Schools

Secondary schools
Fenelon Falls Secondary School
I. E. Weldon Secondary School
Lindsay Collegiate and Vocational Institute
Primary schools
Central Senior School

References

External links

 Victoria County Board of Education (Archive)
 Victoria County - Trillium Lakelands District School Board (Archive)

Former school districts in Ontario
1999 disestablishments in Ontario
Educational institutions disestablished in 1999
Educational institutions with year of establishment missing